is a city located in western Fukuoka Prefecture, Japan. As of April 2018, the city has an estimated population of 96,540, with 34,685 households and a population density of 454 persons per km². The total area is 216.12 km².

The modern city of Itoshima was established on January 1, 2010, from the merger of the city of Maebaru and the towns of Shima and Nijo (both from Itoshima district).

Geography 
The city contains several mountains, islands, and moderately populated low-lying areas. Its highest point is Mt. Rai. It is bordered by Fukuoka to the east, the Genkai Sea to the north, and the Sefuri mountains to the south.

Climate
Itoshima has a humid subtropical climate (Köppen: Cfa).

Adjacent municipalities
 Fukuoka, Fukuoka
 Saga, Saga
 Karatsu, Saga

Demographics
Per Japanese census data, the population of Itoshima in 2020 is 98,877 people. Itoshima has been conducting censuses since 1920.

Culture & Tourism 
Itoshima is known for its seaside resorts, beaches, and natural beauty. It is a popular site for surfing and hiking. A summer music festival, SUNSET LIVE, takes place each year.

Education

Universities 

 Kyushu University Ito Campus

Notable people from Itoshima, Fukuoka
 Dairoku Harada, Japanese archaeologist.
 Ryuji Ichioka, Japanese professional baseball player (Pitcher - Hiroshima Toyo Carp, Central League, Nippon Professional Baseball).
 Mariko Shinoda, Japanese singer, actress, fashion model, and former member of the Japanese idol group AKB48
 Mako "Hakata Speedster" Yamada, Japanese kickboxer and former boxer.

See also
Chikuhi Line

References

External links

 Itoshima City official website 

 
Cities in Fukuoka Prefecture